Holy Corners Historic District, so named because of its concentration of early 20th-century churches, temples and other large buildings of public assembly, is located on both sides of North Kingshighway Boulevard between and including Westminster Place and Washington Avenue in St. Louis, Missouri. On December 29, 1975, the district was added to the National Register of Historic Places.

Contributing properties
Contributing properties in the district include:
 St. John's Methodist Church, 5000 Washington Boulevard (1902);
 First Church of Christ, Scientist, 475 North Kingshighway Boulevard, corner of Westminster Place (1904);
 Racquet Club, 476 North Kingshighway Boulevard (1906);
 Second Baptist Church, 520 North Kingshighway Boulevard (1907);
 Temple Israel, 5001 Washington Boulevard (1908); and
 Tuscan Masonic Temple, 5015 Westminster Place (1908).

References

Geography of St. Louis
Landmarks of St. Louis
National Register of Historic Places in St. Louis
Renaissance Revival architecture in Missouri
Historic districts on the National Register of Historic Places in Missouri